Cherepovets State University is an educational institution in the Vologda region of Russia. It was founded in 1996 as the Cherepovets State Industrial Institute and Pedagogical Institute. It hosts more than 5,000 students.

The university has the following institutes: 
 Humanities Institute, 
 Institute of Pedagogics and Psychology, 
 Institute of Metallurgy and Chemistry,
 Institute of Economics and Engineering, 
 Institute of Extra-Mural Education.

Admission into the university is based on performance in the Unified State Exam. The UST measures the student's ability to perform in a university setting. In addition, an applicant submits a written application and a school-leaving certificate.

University life begins with a solemn ceremony, initiating freshmen into the students. The rector, vice-rectors and deans make speeches and congratulate students on their new status. The monitors hand out student membership cards, student record books and library cards.

Some students pay tuition; others may receive scholarships. Some students take a postgraduate course and write Ph.D. theses and later doctoral dissertations.

Competitions in skiing, basketball, football are held at the university. The university publishes a newspaper, which contains news about students life.

External links
 http://www.chsu.ru/
 Cherepovets State University on the Interactive Map
 http://www.university-directory.eu/Russian-Federation-%28Russia%29/Cherepovets-State-University.html#.UdRXVZyjs3U (Contact Information)

Universities in Vologda Oblast
Educational institutions established in 1996
1996 establishments in Russia